Viscount  was a Japanese politician and educator of the Meiji period, originally hailing from Toyooka, Hyōgo. He was active in the Monbu-shō (present Monka-shō) and as the president of institutions such as Tokyo Imperial University. Hamao was also, very briefly, Lord Keeper of the Privy Seal of Japan. He was ennobled as a baron on 23 September 1907 and advanced to viscount on 25 November 1921.

Family 
 Viscount Shirō Hamao (1896–1935) - A novelist and lawyer. Born Shirō Katō, he later became an adopted son of Arata, and succeeded to the viscountcy.
 Minoru Hamao (1925–2006) - The second son of Shirō, and an instructor and the Chamberlain of then-Crown Prince Akihito (later the 125th Emperor of Japan).
 Stephen Fumio Hamao (1930–2007) - The third son of Shirō, and a Catholic cardinal.

References 

|-

|-

|-

|-

1849 births
1925 deaths
Presidents of universities and colleges in Japan
Kazoku
People of Meiji-period Japan
Politicians from Hyōgo Prefecture
Presidents of the University of Tokyo